Le Nouveau monde is a 1995 French drama film directed by Alain Corneau about post-World War II France, starring Nicolas Chatel and Sarah Grappin. It also features American actors including James Gandolfini and Alicia Silverstone. It was released as New World, direct-to-video in America. The film was released on 22 February 1995 in France, 20 July 1996 in Japan and 13 January 1998 in Turkey.

Plot 
The 1950s in France. Patrick Carrion (Nicolas Chatel) is a young boy who worships all things American, and comes of age in a small village near a U.S. military base. He has a pleasant French life with a lovely girlfriend, Marie-José Vire (Sarah Grappin) and happy family. But one day, he meets an American soldier named Will Caberra (James Gandolfini) which changes his life forever. The soldier introduces Patrick to American music, fun, freedom and women. Under the soldier's tutelage, the boy follows his dream of becoming a drummer and falling in love with an American girl Trudy Wadd (Alicia Silverstone). Patrick's family and ex-girlfriend witness Patrick's heartbreak when he is faced with the reality that there is a price to pay with some American ways.

Trivia 
 First and last film of Nicolas Chatel.
 Film debut for Sarah Grappin and Erik Svane.
 It is the only film with Alicia Silverstone shot in France.
 Alicia Silverstone can speak fluent French in real life.

Tagline 
 One American soldier would change their lives...forever.

References

External links 
 

1995 films
1995 drama films
Films directed by Alain Corneau
Films set in the 1950s
Films set in France
French drama films
1990s French-language films
1990s French films